Joydrop is a Canadian alternative rock band active in the late 1990s and early 2000s from Toronto, Ontario. The band reunited in 2017. The band consists of vocalist Tara Slone, guitarist Thomas Payne, bassist Tom McKay, and drummer Tony Rabalao.

History
Joydrop was formed in Toronto in 1997. Rabalao and McKay knew each other through recording sessions and tour work and McKay had seen Payne play live a number of times. Once Payne joined they found Slone by placing an ad in Now magazine.

The band's first CD, Metasexual, was released in 1999 on the Tommy Boy label. They performed music from the album at the Horseshoe Tavern in Toronto in March that year. The song "Beautiful" from that album was on the Canadian charts and was used on the film Attraction; it played during the end credits. "Beautiful" was also featured in the film Ginger Snaps 2: Unleashed; it played during the end credits.

Viberate, the band's second album, was also released on Tommy Boy.

The band's single "Sometimes Wanna Die" was featured on MTV2 in the US during the summer of 2001, thanks in part to a music video featuring Tommy Lee. The song was one of the top 100 most played songs on radio in Canada in 2001, ranking #65.

Joydrop appeared as themselves, performing their two hit songs, on an episode of Special Unit 2.

Joydrop was nominated for a Juno Award for Best New Group in 2002.

Following the band's breakup, Slone released a solo album and was a contestant on Rock Star: INXS. Tony Rabalao also went solo and put out a CD under the name Lehlo but plays in Slone's band as well. Thomas McKay is a producer with a recording studio www.exetersoundstudios.com He worked on Slone's and Rabalao's solo CDs as well as numerous other Canadian, American and British bands. Thomas Payne is writing and producing music for stage in Stratford Ontario. As of 2010, Slone is part of Breakfast Television on CKAL-DT (Citytv Calgary).

On April 2, 2017, Joydrop reunited for a performance at Hometown Hockey's tour stop in Guelph, Ontario. The gig led to further performances in 2017, including a show at the Bovine on August 25, 2017 in Toronto.

Discography

Metasexual (released September 22, 1998)

Viberate (released July 17, 2001)

Singles
 "Beautiful" (1999) – No. 20 US Alternative Songs, No. 87 AUS
 "If I Forget" (exclusive to Canada) (1999)
 "Spiders" (exclusive to US) (2000)
 "Sometimes Wanna Die" (2001)
 "American Dream Girl" (2001)

References

Canadian alternative rock groups
Musical groups from Toronto
Musical groups established in 1997
Musical groups disestablished in 2004
Musical groups reestablished in 2017